The Damdamī Ṭaksāl is an orthodox Sikh cultural and educational organization, based in India. Its headquarters are located in the town of Mehta Chowk, approximately 40 km north of the city of Amritsar. It has been described as a seminary or “moving university” of the Sikh countryside.

History 

In 1706, after the Battle of Muktsar, the army of Guru Gobind Singh camped at Sabo Ki Talwandi. This acted as a damdamā, or halting place (lit. "breathing place"), and is now the site of Takht Sri Damdamā Sahib. That year, Guru Gobind Singh is said to have founded a distinguished school of exegesis, later headed up by Baba Deep Singh. Damdamā Sahib was considered to be the highest seat of learning for the Sikhs during the 18th century, and Damdami Taksal claims direct historical ties to Guru Gobind Singh, who entrusted it with the responsibility of teaching the reading (santhyā), analysis (vichār) and recitation of the Sikh scriptures, and Baba Deep Singh. The word ṭaksāl (lit. 'mint') refers to an education institute; which is a community of students who associate themselves with a particular sant (lit. spiritual leader or saint).

The main center of the present-day Damdami Taksal (Jatha Bhindran-Mehta) is located at Gurdwārā Gurdarshan Parkāsh in Mehta, Amritsar. It is actually a branch of a major school of traditional Sikh learning known as the Bhindrāṅ Ṭaksāl which is based Mehta. Although, this Taksal was established in 1906 by Sundar Singh (1883-1930) of Boparai Kalan in Ludhiana. It achieved prominence through its second incumbent, Gurbachan Singh Khalsa (1902-1969) of Bhindran Kalan, hence its name. He devoted his entire life to teaching the enunciation and intonation in reciting the Sikh scriptures. He trained a large number of gianīs, traditional Sikh scholars, through his mobile seminary. When he died in 1969 he was succeeded by two contenders, Giani Mohan Singh (1919-2020), leading the original Bhindrāṅ Kalāṅ branch in Ludhiana and Kartar Singh Khalsa (1932-1977), leading the Mehtā branch in Amritsar district.

During much of the mid-1900s, Gurbachan Singh Khalsa was a prominent sant teaching a large number of students and remains an influential figure. The influence of Bhindran Taksal is attested by the fact that its alumni include the mukkh granthī (chief reader of Sikh scriptures) at the Golden Temple, jathedārs of various Sikh takhts, and granthīs of major gurdwaras. 

The Damdami Taksal also had a history of dispute with the Indian government, as a previous leader, Kartar Singh Khalsa, had been a severe critic of the excesses of Indira Gandhi’s Emergency rule. In 1975, a large event to commemorate the 300th anniversary martyrdom of Guru Tegh Bahadur was attended by Indira Gandhi and Kartar Singh Khalsa. This was the starting point of tensions between Damdami Taksal and the Central Government under Congress. The dispute was about who was the leader and who had the greater authority over the Sikh people, the Guru Granth Sahib or Indira Gandhi.

The Damdami Taksal was first brought to wider national attention by Jarnail Singh Bhindranwale during the 1978 Sikh–Nirankari clashes, the Anandpur Resolution, the Dharam Yudh Morcha of 1982, and later the Khalistan movement and insurgency.

Jathedars of Damdami Taksal

Leadership
During British Colonial rule, Sunder Singh Bhindranwala set about purging diversity in Sikh doctrine, ritual and practice, hoping to have a uniform Sikh community. Part of this strategy was to have a Rehat Maryada i.e. standardised code of conduct .

Sunder Singh was succeeded by Gurbachan Singh Khalsa in 1930, after whom Kartar Singh Bhindranwala continued his work in 1961. Kartar Singh established Gurdwara Gurdarshan Parkash at Mehta, Amritsar. In 1977, after the death of Kartar Singh, Jarnail Singh Bhindranwala became the head of Damdami Taksal. 

Thakur Singh Bhindranwala took over his Taksal when Jarnail Singh Bhindranwala was killed in 1984 by the military on Harmander Sahib, referred to as Operation Bluestar. After the death of Thakur Singh, the leadership of Taksal was handed over to Ram Singh Khalsa by SGPC in January 2005. though the senior leadership and members of Taksal accepted Harnam Singh Khalsa as the successor. In July 2017, Taksal chief Harnam Singh Khalsa was hailed as the successor to Jarnail Singh Bhindrawala by the SGPC.

Beliefs
The Damdami Taksal have their own Sikh Code of Conduct, the Gurmat Rehat Maryada, which differs from the Rehat Maryada published by the Shiromani Gurdwara Prabandhak Committee. Some differences include the reading of Ragmala after Akhand Path. Damdami Taksal is somewhat influenced by the Nirmala school of thought as the eleventh leader of Damdami Taksal, Bishan Singh Muralewale, studied under Nirmala Sants such as Pundit Tara Singh and Pundit Sadhu Singh during the late 19th century.

Vegetarianism

The Damdami Taksal who cite the Guru Granth Sahib advocate a strict lacto-vegetarian diet. Eating meat is not allowed in any form including eggs, fish and gelatine.

See also
 Khalsa
 Nirmala
 Sects of Sikhism

Notes

References

Further reading
Giani Jaswant singh Manji Sahib Book ~ Chita Chola

External links
Damdami Taksal – Official Website

Khalistan movement
Religions that require vegetarianism
Schools in Punjab, India
Sikh groups and sects
Sikh politics